There have been two baronetcies created for persons with the surname Bowman, both in the Baronetage of the United Kingdom.

The Bowman Baronetcy, Clifford Street in the parish of St James, Westminster, in the County of Middlesex and of Joldwynds in the parish of Holmbury St Mary in the County of Surrey, was created in the Baronetage of the United Kingdom on 23 January 1884 for the prominent surgeon, histologist and anatomist William Bowman. He was succeeded by his eldest son, the second Baronet, who was a barrister. He also assumed by Royal licence the additional surname of Paget, which was that of his maternal grandfather (however, none of the subsequent holders used this surname). His eldest son, the third Baronet, was a clergyman and served as Rector of Shere, Surrey, and as Rural Dean for Cranleigh, Surrey. His line of the family failed on the death of his only son, the fourth Baronet, who died without surviving male issue in 1994. The late Baronet was succeeded by his second cousin, the fifth Baronet. He was the grandson of John Frederick Bowman, second son of the first Baronet. On his death in 2003 the title became extinct.

The Bowman Baronetcy, of Killingworth in the County of Northumberland, was created in the Baronetage of the United Kingdom on 18 January 1961 for the trade unionist and industrial administrator Sir James Bowman, KBE. The title became extinct on the death of his son, the second Baronet, in 1990.

Bowman baronets, of Holmbury St Mary (1884)

Sir William Bowman, 1st Baronet (1816–1892)
Sir William Paget Bowman, 2nd Baronet (1845–1917)
Sir Paget Mervyn Bowman, 3rd Baronet (1873–1955)
Sir John Paget Bowman, 4th Baronet (1904–1994)
Sir Paul Humphrey Armytage Bowman, 5th Baronet (1921–2003)

Bowman baronets, of Killingworth (1961)
Sir James Bowman, 1st Baronet (1898–1978)
Sir George Bowman, 2nd Baronet (1923–1990)

References

Kidd, Charles, Williamson, David (editors). Debrett's Peerage and Baronetage (1990 edition). New York: St Martin's Press, 1990.

Extinct baronetcies in the Baronetage of the United Kingdom